Niels Petersen may refer to:

 Niels Petersen (gymnast) (1885–1961), Danish Olympic gymnast
 Niels Helveg Petersen (1939–2017), Danish politician
 Niels Petersen (sport shooter) (born 1932), Danish former sport shooter
 Niels Petersen (weightlifter) (born 1918), Danish weightlifter
 Niels Petersen (1845–1923), Danish pioneer of the town of Tempe, Arizona and owner of the historic Niels Petersen House